Shaun Scott (born 1954) is a British television actor. He was educated at Reed's School, Cobham, Surrey.

He appeared in the popular long-running series of The Bill where he played DI Chris Deakin (he previously played a villain in series 6 episode 92, series 8 episode 83, as well as series 9 episode 13). He also appeared as deputy lock keeper Tom Pike in the 1989 BBC TV comedy The River with David Essex. He also played Harchester United manager Patrick Doyle in Sky One's football drama Dream Team and appeared as a villainous regular in the Scottish Gaelic soap opera Machair.

Scott also played Jack Fairchild in the comedy series Brass. He also appeared as a fresh-faced lad of 19 taken in by the Bourne family as handy man after being bound over for stealing a bicycle in the ATV daytime drama "The Cedar Tree" (1976–77). His theatre credits include, Crazy for You, Prince Edward Theatre; Heartbreak House, Haymarket Theatre, dir. Trevor Nunn; The Shaughraun, Royal National Theatre and Translations, National Theatre.

In 2022, he played Bertrand Crawley in the Disney+ series Moon Knight.

Filmography

Film

Television

References

External links

1954 births
British male television actors
Living people
People educated at Reed's School
Alumni of RADA